Javad Karimi (born March 1, 1998, in Sari) is an Iranian volleyball player who plays as a setter for the Iranian national team and Polish club Warta Zawiercie.

He played for Iranian national team in the 2019 FIVB Volleyball Nations League.

Honours

National team
Asian Championship
Gold medal (2): 2019, 2021
Asian Cup
Silver medal (1): 2018
Islamic Solidarity Games
Gold medal (1): 2017
Asian U23 Championship
Gold medal (1): 2017
Asian U20 Championship
Gold medal (1): 2014
Silver medal (1): 2016
U19 World Championship
Bronze medal (1): 2015
Asian U18 Championship
Gold medal (1): 2014

Individual
Best Setter: 2014 Asian U18 Championship
Best Setter: 2016 Asian U20 Championship
Best Setter: 2018 Asian Cup
Best Setter: 2021 Asian Championship

References

External links

 

1998 births
Living people
Iranian men's volleyball players
Sportspeople from Mazandaran province
Iranian expatriate sportspeople in Belgium
Olympic volleyball players of Iran
Volleyball players at the 2020 Summer Olympics
Setters (volleyball)
Islamic Solidarity Games competitors for Iran
21st-century Iranian people